Mu Jiang or Miu Chiang (621–564 BC), was a Chinese ruler, the Duchess consort of Duke Xian of Lu (r. 608–591 BC).

She was the daughter of the Marquis of Qi. She married Duke Xian of Lu and became the mother of Duke Cheng of Lu (r. 590–573 BC).

Both her spouse and her son were passive rulers, and Mu Jiang had great influence over the affairs of state during their rule, supported by her status as a member of the ruling family of Qin, on which Lu was dependant.  She influenced the decisions of war and piece, and participated in negotiations with foreign states.   Her main focus was to crush the powerful Ji and Meng clans.  In 575, she finally convinced her son to have them punished on the excuse of treason.   He promised to do so On return from the war, but in his absence, she had her lover Shusun Qiao act against them.  Their action failed and ended in a coup during which her lover was forced to flee while she was placed in house arrest in the Eastern Hall by the Ji and Meng clans.

She is included in the "Biographies of Pernicious and Depraved Women" of the Biographies of Eminent women (Lienü zhuan).

References 

7th-century BC births
564 BC deaths
6th-century BC Chinese people
7th-century BC Chinese people
6th-century BC Chinese women
7th-century BC Chinese women
Duchesses